Demon Front is a side-scrolling run and gun arcade game released in 2002 by International Games System. It shares many characteristics with the Metal Slug series.

Gameplay
The gameplay is similar to Metal Slug and other run and gun games. It lacks the vehicles that were an element of Metal Slug.

In addition, there are some unique features in the game. Each of the four characters brings along a pet, which can be sent to attack enemies or used as a shield.  There are three buttons: Shoot, jump, and shield. Holding the shoot button charges the player's pet, and when released the pet launches a stationary devastating attack for a few seconds. The shield button converts the pet into a shield that is permanent - until players press the button again or it takes enough damage to disappear. Melee attacks and pet attacks release hearts which boost their shield power.

Characters include Jake and Sara, two regular humans from Earth. Dr. J, a scientist, and Maya an ape. All characters largely play the same.

External links
 Official Site 
 NFC World Info and Screenshots
 IGN-PSM Videos, Screenshots and Artwork

Arcade video games
Arcade-only video games
2002 video games
International Games System games
PolyGame Master games
Run and gun games
Video game clones
Video games developed in Taiwan
Cooperative video games
Video games about demons
Fantasy video games